Jeffrey Cirio (born 1991) is an American ballet dancer. He joined the Boston Ballet in 2009, and was promoted to principal dancer in 2012. In 2015, he moved to the American Ballet Theatre as a soloist, and was promoted to principal dancer the following year. In 2018, he joined the English National Ballet as a principal dancer. He will return to Boston Ballet in the 2022/23 season.

Early life
Cirio was raised in Philadelphia. His father immigrated to the US from the Philippines as a child; his mother is of Irish and German descent. When he was seven, his family moved to Carlisle, Pennsylvania as his sister, Lia, was training at the Central Pennsylvania Youth Ballet. Cirio himself started ballet training there two years later, and was homeschooled. The Cirios later moved to Boston when Lia became an apprentice at the Boston Ballet. Cirio also trained at the Boston Ballet, and Orlando Ballet School.

Career
Cirio joined the corps de ballet of Boston Ballet in 2009, and was promoted to Principal at the company in 2012. In 2015, he left Boston Ballet to join the American Ballet Theatre as a Soloist. He debuted his first full-length role during the Metropolitan Opera House season as Colas in La fille mal gardée. Cirio's promotion to Principal Dancer at ABT was announced by Kevin McKenzie in July 2016, making him the first Filipino-American male principal in the company's history.

In 2018, Cirio joined the English National Ballet as a lead principal dancer, after spending four months with the company as a guest artist.

In 2022, it was announced that Cirio would return to Boston Ballet in the 2022-23 season but would make guest appearances in May prior to his official return.

Cirio and his sister, Lia, also a Principal Dancer at Boston Ballet, established an artistic collective called Cirio Collective in 2015.

Selected repertoire
Cirio's repertoire with the Boston Ballet, American Ballet Theatre and English National Ballet includes:

Awards
Awards:
Junior Gold Medal YAGP (2006)
Bronze Medal, USA Int’l Ballet Competition (2006)
Silver Medal, Seoul Int’l Dance Competition (2008)
Gold Medal, Helsinki International Ballet Competition (2009)
Senior Grand Prix YAGP (2009)
NFAA Silver Level Award (2009)
Princess Grace Fellowship (2009)
UK National Dance Award Nomination (2013)
Benois de la Danse Nomination (2017)

References

American male ballet dancers
Princess Grace Awards winners
1991 births
Living people
English National Ballet principal dancers
American Ballet Theatre principal dancers
Boston Ballet principal dancers
American expatriates in England
American dancers of Asian descent
American people of Filipino descent
American people of Irish descent
American people of German descent
21st-century American ballet dancers
Dancers from Pennsylvania